Gibbs Glacier is a glacier,  long, flowing southeast into the northern part of Mercator Ice Piedmont on the east side of the Antarctic Peninsula. This feature together with Neny Glacier, which flows northwest, occupy a transverse depression between Mercator Ice Piedmont and Neny Fjord on the west side of the Antarctic Peninsula. Gibbs Glacier was photographed from the air and first mapped by the United States Antarctic Service, 1939–41, and the Ronne Antarctic Research Expedition, 1947–48. It was named by the UK Antarctic Place-Names Committee for Peter M. Gibbs of the Falkland Islands Dependencies Survey, a surveyor at Horseshoe Island, 1957, and leader at Stonington Island, 1958, who was responsible (with P. Forster) for the first ground survey of the glacier.

References

Glaciers of Fallières Coast